Encadenado (English: Chained) is the eighth studio album by Mexican pop singer Mijares. This album was released on March 23, 1993. This album was produced by Juan Carlos Calderón and Julio Palacios. It didn't perform very well in the charts nor the singles, and it kept him dormant between the people.

Track listing
Tracks:
 Volverás
 Ahora se me va
 Encadenado
 No me esperes más
 Que puedo hacer yo con tanto amor
 Él
 Mi amiga soledad
 Voy a gritar a los cuatro vientos
 La duda
 Amanecer en tu cuerpo

Singles
 Encadenado
 Que puedo Hacer yo con Tanto Amor
 Ahora se me va

Single charts

Album charts
The album reached the 5th position in Billboard Latin Pop Albums.

1993 albums
Manuel Mijares albums
Albums produced by Juan Carlos Calderón